, also known as Kendo Rage 2, is a 1995 fighting game released exclusively in Japan for the Super Famicom by Datam Polystar. It was re-released for the PlayStation.

Plot 
The game stars Hikari Tsurugino, who is the sister of the protagonist from the original game.

Development 
It is a sequel to Makeruna! Makendō (Kendo Rage).

Gameplay
Makeruna! Makendō 2 is a 2D fighting game featuring magical attacks. The game features RPG elements, where you character can level up, and the higher your level, the more kinds of attacks the player has.

It plays similarly to other 2D versus fighting games, in which the player's character fights against their opponent in a best of two-out-of-three matches in a single player tournament mode with the computer, or against another human player. In the original Super Famicom version, the gameplay has a traditional combo system. In the PlayStation version, the combo system and speed were increased.

Release 
The game was released on March 17, 1995 for the Super Famicom in Japan. It was released on November 10, 1995 for the PlayStation. The port was handled by Fill-in-Cafe.

The PlayStation version was later re-released for the PlayStation Network in 2010. It was released for PSN Imports for outside of Japan in by Gungho America. It was released simultaneously with Art Camion Sugorokuden, Finger Flashing, Lup Salad, Vehicle Cavalier, and Zanac x Zanac. It retailed for US$5.99.

Reception
On release, Famitsu magazine scored the Super Famicom version of the game a 21 out of 40. Famitsu rated the PlayStation version 20 out of 40.

References

External links
Makeruna! Makendō 2 at MobyGames
Makeruna! Makendō 2 at super-famicom.jp 
Promotional flyer at gamedic 

1995 video games
Datam Polystar
Fill-in-Cafe games
Multiplayer and single-player video games
PlayStation (console) games
PlayStation Network games
Success (company) games
Super Nintendo Entertainment System games
Fighting games
Video games developed in Japan
Video games featuring female protagonists
Video games set in Japan
Video game sequels